Claudio Cavalieri (born 4 August 1954 in Rome, died 9 June 1977) was an Italian professional football player.

His debut season, in which he played 2 games for A.S. Roma, was his only season in the Serie A.

References

1954 births
1977 deaths
Italian footballers
Serie A players
A.S. Roma players
U.S. Avellino 1912 players
Association football defenders